Jet-Puffed Marshmallows is a brand of marshmallow and similar products, manufactured by Kraft Foods and first introduced in 1958. First sold as a national brand in 1959, it has more than 30 different products to its brand name.

History
It was first a simulated space ship made by Aerojet-General Corporation, for Kraft Foods Inc. to sell because it was in a limited market the first year. Nineteen U.S. cities had young people waiting in long lines for their chance to sit at the control panels. Kraft gave away the space ship as the top prize in the ongoing "Name the Space Training Ship" promotion. 

In 1964 Jet-Puffed marshmallows began making Easter candies, cookies, and cupcakes. Kraft has offered a replica of the marshmallow dispenser that Spock used in the movie Star Trek V: The Final Frontier.

Later, Kraft marshmallow business (including Jet-Puffed marshmallows) was sold to Favorite Brands International in 1995. Nabisco purchased Favorite Brands International in 1999 and Kraft Foods later purchased Nabisco in 2000, returning Jet-Puffed marshmallows to Kraft.

Flavors
Primary flavors include orange, chocolate and original. Other flavors include strawberry, lemon, and lime, as well as various seasonal flavors such as peppermint.

See also
 List of Kraft brands
 General Foods Corporation
 Ovson Egg

References

External links
 

Kraft Foods brands
Marshmallows
Products introduced in 1958